Pagara is a monotypic moth genus in the family Erebidae. Its only species, Pagara simplex, the mouse-colored lichen moth, is found in North America, where it has been recorded from Alabama, Arkansas, Florida, Georgia, Illinois, Indiana, Iowa, Kansas, Kentucky, Maryland, Mississippi, New Hampshire, North Carolina, Ohio, Oklahoma, South Carolina and Tennessee. Both the genus and species were described by Francis Walker in 1856.

The wingspan is about 23 mm. Adults have been recorded on wing year round in the southern part of the range.

Former species
Pagara fuscipes (Grote, 1883)

References

Phaegopterina
Moths described in 1856
Monotypic moth genera